The 2004 United States presidential election in Colorado took place on November 2, 2004, and was part of the 2004 United States presidential election. Voters chose nine representatives, or electors to the Electoral College, who voted for president and vice president.

Colorado was won by incumbent President George W. Bush by a 4.67% margin of victory. Prior to the election, ten of twelve news organizations considered this a state Bush would win, or otherwise considered as a red state, although both campaigns targeted it as the Democratic candidate, John Kerry, was born in Colorado. On election day, Bush did carry Colorado, but by only about half the 8.4% margin he won over Al Gore in 2000. Additionally, Colorado voters decided not to pass a referendum that would have split their electoral vote for this and future presidential elections.

, this is the last time the Republican nominee carried Colorado in a presidential election, as well as Arapahoe County, Jefferson County, Larimer County, and Ouray County. This is also the only presidential election that Broomfield County, created in 2001, has voted Republican. It was also the first time any candidate received a million votes in the state.  It was also the last time Colorado voted to the right of the nation as a whole in a presidential election. Bush became the first Republican to win the White House without carrying Clear Creek, Eagle, Gunnison, or Routt Counties since William Howard Taft in 1908, as well as the first to do so without carrying La Plata County since Calvin Coolidge in 1924, and the first to do so without carrying San Juan County since Herbert Hoover in 1928.

Colorado was 1 of 9 states to back George W. Bush twice that only backed George H. W. Bush once.

Primaries
2004 Colorado Democratic primary

Campaign

Predictions

There were 12 news organizations who made state-by-state predictions of the election. Here are their last predictions before election day.

Polling

Although considered a battleground state, Bush won almost every pre-election poll. The final three polls averaged Bush leading with 51% to 44%.

Fundraising
Bush raised $2,598,226. Kerry raised $3,229,631.

Advertising and visits
In the fall election campaign, the Republican ticket visited Colorado 5 times. The Democratic ticket visited 7 times. Bush and Kerry also heavily advertised each week. Bush spent just over $400,000 each week. Kerry spent over $500,000 each week.

Analysis
The key to Bush's victory in the state was winning most of the largely populated counties, such as Jefferson County, Douglas County, El Paso County, Arapahoe County, and Larimer County. Combined with his strength in rural Colorado, this offset Kerry's strength in Denver and Boulder County and in several smaller counties hosting ski resorts, such as Gunnison (Crested Butte), Eagle (Vail), Routt (Steamboat Springs), and La Plata (Purgatory Resort).

Nevertheless, Bush's margin in Colorado was reduced substantially with respect to 2000, even as nationally he improved from losing the popular vote by 0.5% to winning it by 2.5%. Kerry flipped seven counties—Gunnison, Eagle, Routt, La Plata, Clear Creek, Conejos, and San Juan, the last of which voted Democratic for the first time since Lyndon Johnson's 1964 landslide. Most critically, however, Bush's vote share in the city of Denver dipped from 30.9% to 29.3%--a lower vote share than Dole had received in the city in 1996—and his margin of defeat in Denver swelled from 31.0% to 40.3%, as Kerry won the highest vote share in the city of any nominee in over a century. Similarly, in Boulder County, the other large blue jurisdiction in the state at the time, Bush's vote share dipped from 36.4% to 32.4%--again, below Dole's in 1996—and Kerry expanded Gore's 13.7% margin to 33.9%, as he posted the best showing in the county of any nominee since Eisenhower in 1956. Meanwhile, Bush's margin shrank markedly in Jefferson, Arapahoe, and Larimer Counties, in all of which Kerry gained substantially on Gore. Bush's vote share actually receded slightly in Arapahoe and Larimer. All of these trends continued into 2008 and beyond, contributing to making Colorado a lean-Democratic, and, by 2020, a relatively solidly Democratic, state. Despite what at the time was a historically low vote share in Denver, Bush remains, as of 2020, the last Republican to have cracked even a quarter of the vote in Denver.

At the same time, Bush also had areas of improvement in Colorado. He increased his margin in then-staunchly Republican El Paso County by 1.5%, and cut Kerry's margin in Pueblo County, historically the largest Democratic stronghold in the state, from 11.3% to 6.3%, posting the best showing for a Republican in the county since 1984. He also flipped Huerfano County, becoming the first Republican to carry it since Nixon's 1972 landslide; his win there reflected what was, for a Republican, his strong appeal amongst Hispanic voters, which also helped him narrowly carry New Mexico and boosted his margin in his home state of Texas.

Bush carried Colorado despite the Centennial State being Kerry's birth state. Ironically, Bush simultaneously lost his own birth state of Connecticut, making this the only election since 1864 where neither candidate carried their birth state.

Results

Results by county

Counties that flipped from Democratic to Republican 
 Huerfano (largest municipality: Walsenburg)

Counties that flipped from Republican to Democratic
 Clear Creek (largest municipality: Idaho Springs)
 Conejos (largest municipality: Manassa)
 Eagle (largest municipality: Edwards)
 Gunnison (largest municipality: Gunnison)
 La Plata (largest municipality: Durango)
 Routt (largest municipality: Steamboat Springs)
 San Juan (largest municipality: Silverton)

Results by congressional district
Bush won 4 of 7 congressional districts. Both candidates won a district held by the other party.

Electors

Technically the voters of Colorado cast their ballots for electors: representatives to the Electoral College. Colorado is allocated 9 electors because it has seven congressional districts and two senators. All candidates who appear on the ballot or qualify to receive write-in votes must submit a list of nine electors, who pledge to vote for their candidate and his or her running mate. Whoever wins the majority of votes in the state is awarded all nine electoral votes. Their chosen electors then vote for president and vice president. Although electors are pledged to their candidate and running mate, they are not obligated to vote for them. An elector who votes for someone other than his or her candidate is known as a faithless elector.

The electors of each state and the District of Columbia met on December 13, 2004, to cast their votes for president and vice president. The Electoral College itself never meets as one body. Instead the electors from each state and the District of Columbia met in their respective capitols.

The following were the members of the Electoral College from the state. All were pledged to and voted for George W. Bush and Dick Cheney.
 Theodore S. Halaby
 Robert A. Martinez
 Lilly Y. Nunez
 Cynthia H. Murphy
 Sylvia Morgan-Smith
 Diane B. Gallagher
 Vicki A. Edwards
Frances W. Owens
 Booker T. Graves

Failed election reform

There was a Constitutional amendment put on the ballot in the state to alter the way the state's electors would be distributed among presidential candidates, but was rejected by the voters in 2004.

Notes

References

Colorado
2004
Presidential